Tarkhanovo is a rural locality (a village) in Denisovskoye Rural Settlement, Gorokhovetsky District, Vladimir Oblast, Russia. The population was 12 as of 2010.

Geography 
Tarkhanovo is located 29 km west of Gorokhovets (the district's administrative centre) by road. Krutovo is the nearest rural locality.

References 

Rural localities in Gorokhovetsky District